John Wilden Hughes Jr. (February 18, 1950 – August 6, 2009) was an American filmmaker. Hughes began his career in 1970 as an author of humorous essays and stories for the National Lampoon magazine. He went on to Hollywood to write, produce and sometimes direct some of the most successful live-action comedy films of the 1980s and 1990s such as National Lampoon's Vacation; Mr. Mom; Sixteen Candles; Weird Science; The Breakfast Club; Ferris Bueller's Day Off; Pretty in Pink; Some Kind of Wonderful; Planes, Trains and Automobiles; She's Having a Baby; The Great Outdoors; Uncle Buck; Home Alone; Dutch; Beethoven (co-written under the pseudonym Edmond Dantès); Dennis the Menace; and Baby's Day Out.

Most of Hughes's work is set in the Chicago metropolitan area. He is best known for his coming-of-age teen comedy films with honest depictions of suburban teenage life. Many of his most enduring characters from these years were written for Molly Ringwald, who was Hughes's muse.

While out on a walk one morning in New York in the summer of 2009, Hughes suffered a fatal heart attack. His legacy after his death was honored by many, including at the 82nd Academy Awards by actors with whom he had worked such as Ringwald, Matthew Broderick, Anthony Michael Hall, Chevy Chase, and Macaulay Culkin, among others. Actors whose careers Hughes helped launch include Michael Keaton, Hall, Bill Paxton, Broderick, Culkin, and members of the Brat Pack group.

Early life
Hughes was born on February 18, 1950, in Lansing, Michigan, to Marion Crawford, who volunteered in charity work, and John Hughes Sr., who worked in sales. He was the only boy, and had three sisters. He spent the first twelve years of his life in Grosse Pointe, Michigan, where he was a fan of Detroit Red Wings #9 Gordie Howe. Hughes described himself as "kind of quiet" as a kid.

In 1963, Hughes's family moved to Northbrook, Illinois, a suburb of Chicago. There, his father found work selling roofing materials. Hughes attended Grove Middle School, later going on to Glenbrook North High School, which gave him inspiration for the films that eventually made his reputation. He met Nancy Ludwig, a cheerleader and his future wife, in high school. As a teenager, Hughes found movies as an escape. According to childhood friend Jackson Peterson, "His mom and dad criticized him a lot (...) She [Marion] would be critical of what John would want to do". Hughes was an avid fan of the Beatles, and according to several friends, he knew a lot about movies and the Rat Pack.

Career
After dropping out of the University of Arizona, Hughes began selling jokes to well-established performers such as Rodney Dangerfield and Joan Rivers. Hughes used his jokes to get an entry-level job at Needham, Harper & Steers as an advertising copywriter in Chicago in 1970 and later in 1974 at Leo Burnett Worldwide. During this period, he created what became the famous Edge "Credit Card Shaving Test" ad campaign.

Hughes's work on the Virginia Slims account frequently took him to the Philip Morris headquarters in New York City, which allowed him to visit the offices of National Lampoon magazine. Soon thereafter, Hughes became a regular contributor; editor P. J. O'Rourke recalled that "John wrote so fast and so well that it was hard for a monthly magazine to keep up with him". One of Hughes's first stories, inspired by his family trips as a child, was "Vacation '58", later to become the basis for the film National Lampoon's Vacation. Among his other contributions to the Lampoon, the April Fools' Day stories "My Penis" and "My Vagina" gave an early indication of Hughes's ear for the particular rhythm of teenspeak, as well as for the various indignities of teenage life in general.

His first credited screenplay, National Lampoon's Class Reunion, was written while still on staff at the magazine. The resulting film became the second disastrous attempt by the flagship to duplicate the runaway success of National Lampoon's Animal House. Hughes's next screenplay for the imprint, however, National Lampoon's Vacation, would become a major hit in 1983. This, along with the success of another Hughes script that same year, Mr. Mom, earned him a three-film deal with Universal Pictures.

Teen films
Hughes's directorial debut, Sixteen Candles, won almost unanimous praise when it was released in 1984, due in no small part to its more honest depiction of navigating adolescence and the social dynamics of high school life in stark contrast to the Porky's-inspired comedies made at the time. It was the first in a string of efforts about teenage life set in or around high school, including The Breakfast Club, Weird Science, and Ferris Bueller's Day Off, all of which he wrote and directed, and Pretty in Pink and Some Kind of Wonderful, which he wrote.

Beyond teen movies
To avoid being pigeonholed as a maker of only teen movies, Hughes branched out in 1987 by writing, directing, and producing the hit comedy Planes, Trains and Automobiles starring Steve Martin and John Candy. His later output was not so well received critically, though films like Uncle Buck and National Lampoon's Christmas Vacation proved popular. His final film as a director was 1991's Curly Sue. By that time, in 1991, his John Hughes Entertainment production company had signed various deals with 20th Century Fox and Warner Bros.

Hughes's greatest commercial success came with Home Alone (1990), a film he wrote and produced about a child accidentally left behind when his family goes away for Christmas, forcing him to protect himself and his house from a pair of inept burglars. Hughes completed the first draft of Home Alone in just 9 days. Home Alone was the top-grossing film of 1990 and remains the most successful live-action family comedy of all time. He followed up with the sequels Home Alone 2: Lost in New York in 1992 and Home Alone 3 in 1997. Some of the subsequent films he wrote and produced during this time also contained elements of the Home Alone formula, including the successful Dennis the Menace (1993) and the box office flop Baby's Day Out (1994).

He also wrote screenplays under the pseudonym Edmond Dantes (or Dantès), after the protagonist of Alexandre Dumas's novel The Count of Monte Cristo. Screenplays credited to the Dantes nom de plume include Maid in Manhattan, Drillbit Taylor and Beethoven.

Collaboration with John Candy

Actor John Candy created many memorable roles in films written, directed or produced by Hughes, including National Lampoon's Vacation (1983), Planes, Trains and Automobiles (1987), The Great Outdoors (1988), Uncle Buck (1989), Home Alone (1990), Career Opportunities (1991) and Only the Lonely (1991).

Over the years, Hughes and Candy developed a close friendship. Hughes was greatly shaken by Candy's sudden death from a heart attack in 1994. "He talked a lot about how much he loved Candy—if Candy had lived longer, I think John would have made more films as a director", says Vince Vaughn, a friend of Hughes.

Unproduced screenplays

 National Lampoon's Jaws 3: People 0 – a parody sequel to the popular film series (1979)
 Motorheads Vs. Sportos, aka Just Like Romeo And Juliet, aka Suburban Westside Story
 The History of Ohio from the Beginning of Time to the End of the Universe, also known as National Lampoon's Dacron, Ohio (1980; with P. J. O'Rourke)
 The Joy of Sex: A Dirty Love Story (1982; some drafts with Dan Greenburg) 
 Debs – a satire on Texas debutantes (1983; Aaron Spelling Productions)
 The New Kid (1986)
 Oil and Vinegar – a soon-to-be-married man and a hitchhiking girl end up talking about their lives during the length of the car ride (1987)
 Bartholomew Vs. Neff – a vehicle that would have starred Sylvester Stallone and John Candy as feuding neighbors (1991)
 Black Cat Bone: The Return of Huckleberry Finn (1991)
 The Nanny (1991)
 The Bugster (1991)
 Ball 'n' Chain (1991)
 Live-action Peanuts film – Warner Bros. acquired the film rights to make a live-action Charlie Brown film, with Hughes set to both produce and write (1993)
 The Pajama Game - Warner Bros planned a remake for the film.
 Damn Yankees - Warner Bros planned a remake for the film.
 The Bee – a feature-length Disney film that actor Daniel Stern was attached to direct (1994)
 Tickets – Teens wait overnight for free tickets to a farewell concert (1996)
 How the Grinch Stole Christmas – Hughes pitched a film version of How the Grinch Stole Christmas! to various studios before it was adapted into the 2000 live-action film (1998)
 The Grigsbys Go Broke – a wealthy family lose their fortune, forcing them to move to the other side of the tracks. (2003)

Later years 
In 1994, Hughes retired from the public eye and moved back to the Chicago area. The following year, Hughes and Ricardo Mestres, both of whom had production deals with Walt Disney Pictures, formed the short-lived joint venture production studio Great Oaks Entertainment. Hughes worked in Chicago, while Mestres was based in Los Angeles. The company produced the films Jack, 101 Dalmatians, and Flubber, but Hughes and Mestres ended their partnership in 1997. The 1998 film Reach the Rock, which was produced as part of the partnership between Hughes and Mestres, was subsequently credited as "a Gramercy Pictures release of a John Hughes and Ricardo Mestres production".

In the following years, Hughes rarely granted interviews to the media, save a select few in 1999 to promote the soundtrack album of Reach the Rock. The album was compiled by Hughes's son, John Hughes III, and released on his son's Chicago-based record label Hefty Records. He also recorded an audio commentary for the 1999 DVD release of Ferris Bueller's Day Off.

Personal life 
In 1970, then-20-year old Hughes married Nancy Ludwig, whom he had met in high school. Together they had two children: John Hughes III (born in 1976) and James Hughes (born in 1979). They were together until his death in 2009. Nancy Hughes died on September 15, 2019.

Michael Weiss argued that Hughes' films expressed a Reagan Republican worldview. In response to this, PJ O'Rourke wrote that:

Actor Ben Stein, who was a close friend to Hughes, has also stated that Hughes was an "ardent Republican and extreme conservative. He believed Reagan could transform all of us into Ferris Buellers. Ferris was an artifact of a free era. Ronald Reagan was all about freedom."

Death
On August 5, 2009, Hughes and his wife traveled to New York City to visit their son James and their new grandson. James said his father appeared to be in good health that night and that the family had made plans for the next day. On the morning of August 6, Hughes was taking a walk close to his hotel on West 55th Street in Manhattan when he suffered a heart attack. He was rushed to Roosevelt Hospital, where he was pronounced dead at age 59. Hughes's funeral was held on August 11 in Chicago; he was buried at Lake Forest Cemetery. It was attended by his wife, two children, and his grandchildren.

Legacy
The pilot episode of the NBC comedy Community, broadcast on September 17, 2009, was dedicated to Hughes. The episode included several references to The Breakfast Club and ended with a cover of "Don't You (Forget About Me)". The One Tree Hill episode titled "Don't You Forget About Me", broadcast on February 1, 2010, ended with a scene similar to the ending scene of Sixteen Candles and included some other references to his movies such as Home Alone. The 2011 Bob's Burgers episode "Sheesh! Cab, Bob?" also paid homage to Sixteen Candles.

After Hughes's death, many of those who knew him commented on the impact Hughes had on them and on the film industry. Molly Ringwald said, "I was stunned and incredibly sad to hear about the death of John Hughes. He was and will always be such an important part of my life. ... He will be missed – by me and by everyone that he has touched. My heart and all my thoughts are with his family now." Matthew Broderick also released his own statement, saying, "I am truly shocked and saddened by the news about my old friend John Hughes. He was a wonderful, very talented guy and my heart goes out to his family."

The 82nd Academy Awards (2010) included a tribute to Hughes's work. A retrospective of clips from Hughes's films was followed by cast members from several of them, including Molly Ringwald, Matthew Broderick, Macaulay Culkin, Judd Nelson, Ally Sheedy, Anthony Michael Hall and Jon Cryer, gathering on stage to commemorate Hughes and his contributions to the film industry.

Films with scenes taking place in fictional high schools named after Hughes include: the 2001 satire Not Another Teen Movie, the 2010–2013 Disney Channel sitcom Shake It Up and the 2016 Hallmark film Date With Love.

Hughes's work has also influenced a new generation of millennial filmmakers, including M. H. Murray of Teenagers fame, who has cited Hughes as one of his main influences in interviews, once stating: "I loved how John Hughes wrote teens ... They were flawed in this genuine sort of way." Kelly Fremon Craig, who wrote and directed The Edge of Seventeen, also cited Hughes as an influence.

John Hughes is referenced in Jesu/Sun Kil Moon's song "Hello Chicago". Mark Kozelek recalls a phone conversation with Hughes in which Kozelek asked him for $15,000 in order to release his album Songs for a Blue Guitar (released by his band The Red House Painters). Hughes agreed, stating "You're young and on the rise, and I'm just an old man living in Chicago".

British indie pop band The 1975 cites Hughes as an influence in the band's music.

Maisie Peters released a song called "John Hughes Movie" in 2021.

John Hughes' films served as inspiration for the style and tone of the Marvel Cinematic Universe film Spider-Man: Homecoming directed by Jon Watts, who took inspiration from films like Ferris Bueller's Day Off.

The 2020 Ernest Cline novel Ready Player Two features a quest where the characters visit the planet Shermer which mashes up characters, actors, and sets from various John Hughes movies. The characters must visit a computer-generated avatar of Hughes and change the ending of Pretty in Pink to complete the quest.

Filmography

Film

Acting roles

Television
Writer

As himself

Posthumous credits

Don't You Forget About Me
Don't You Forget About Me is a 2009 documentary about four Canadian filmmakers who go in search of Hughes after he dropped out of the spotlight in 1994. It features interviews with Molly Ringwald, Anthony Michael Hall, Matthew Broderick, and other actors from Hughes's films. The film is named after the Simple Minds song of the same name, which was the theme song for the film The Breakfast Club, which Hughes wrote, produced and directed.

Don't You Forget About Me is also the name of an anthology of contemporary writers writing about the films of John Hughes, edited by Jaime Clarke with a foreword by Ally Sheedy, published by Simon Spotlight Entertainment. Writers include Steve Almond, Julianna Baggott, Lisa Borders, Ryan Boudinot, T Cooper, Quinn Dalton, Emily Franklin, Lisa Gabriele, Tod Goldberg, Nina de Gramont, Tara Ison, Allison Lynn, John McNally, Dan Pope, Lewis Robinson, Ben Schrank, Elizabeth Searle, Mary Sullivan, Rebecca Wolff and Moon Unit Zappa.

Books
 National Lampoon Sunday Newspaper Parody (1978) (with P. J. O'Rourke)

See also
 John Hughes's unrealized projects

References

External links
 
 John Hughes collected coverage from The Guardian
 Times Topic: John Hughes collected coverage from The New York Times
 Guest Book for John Hughes from Legacy.com
 
 Part 1 Part 2 1985 interview podcast from the American Film Institute
 Vanity Fair Interview

1950 births
2009 deaths
21st-century American writers
Film producers from Illinois
American male screenwriters
American television writers
Burials at Lake Forest Cemetery
Comedy film directors
Fantasy film directors
Action film directors
Horror film directors
Science fiction film directors
Western (genre) film directors
Film directors from Illinois
Film directors from Michigan
Glenbrook North High School alumni
American male television writers
National Lampoon people
People from Grosse Pointe, Michigan
People from Northbrook, Illinois
University of Arizona alumni
Writers from Lansing, Michigan
20th-century American male writers
Screenwriters from Illinois
Screenwriters from Michigan
Screenwriters from Arizona
Film producers from Michigan
Film producers from Arizona
20th-century American screenwriters